Dragon Raja (Korean:드래곤 라자; abbreviated as 드라) is the first series of fantasy web novels written by Lee Yeongdo, one of the most famous fantasy novelists in South Korea. The books chronicle the adventures of a 17-year-old boy Hutch Nedval(also spelled as Hoochie Nedval), his mentor Karl Heltant and his friend Sanson Percival, all of whom are from the poor town of Fief Heltant in the Kingdom of Bysus. The main story arc, told in the first-person by Hoochie, concerns the three's quest to rescue their people from the black dragon Amurtaht by finding money to pay the ransom; then to find and protect a lost dragon raja girl, who would serve as the bridge between people and dragons and stop a crimson dragon that terrorized the continent 20 years ago.

Lee showcased his first chapters of Dragon Raja on 3 October 1997 on a serial forum of an online service provider, Hitel. For the duration of 6 months after the initial debut he updated approximately 12,000 pages of wongoji (a Korean form of Genkō yōshi), a material length equivalent to that of 1715 letter pages, and the story gained explosive popularity on the forum. Golden Bough, an imprint of Minumsa Publishing Group purchased the publishing rights, and Dragon Raja was published upon its completion in 12 paperback volumes.

Prior to 1998 the fantasy genre in Korea, specifically its medievalist form, was considered unsubstantial and unaccounted for by many, especially the press and the literary world. But Dragon Raja was an immediate success, and became the best-selling fantasy title in Korea that grew to be a million seller. As of 2011, Dragon Raja has sold close to 2 million copies in 4 languages.

The success of Dragon Raja prompted two big phenomenon in the Korean publishing industry. First, fantasy literature "gained the attention of publishers and writers as the new goldmine" and opened the new era for Korean fantasy market. Speculative fiction also gained more support in the literary world, and more writers of "serious literature" began using fantasy and science fiction elements in their works.
Secondly, the amount of online serials getting published increased greatly, in mostly "genre literature" (Korean: 장르문학, genre munak), which is a Korean umbrella term for genre of novels including romance, fantasy, wuxia, science fiction and mystery. Once published, it also took relatively less time for such online fiction, or Internet literature (Korean: 인터넷문학, Inteonet munhak), to be adapted into other media, and also in more varied forms. In the case of Dragon Raja was adapted into games, radio drama, and textbook texts.

Plot

Sojourn to the capital 
Amurtaht the black dragon's existence has plagued Fief Heltant for long, and the king has sent the white dragon Catselprime and his raja, a young son of the House of Halschteil to subdue the black dragon. A blind wizard Tyburn arrives at Heltant and helps guard the town while during the battle with Amurtaht. Hoochie helps Tyburn, who gives him in return a pair of Ogre Power Gauntlets or OPG, which gives the wearer great muscle power. The news comes that Catselprime has lost to Amurtaht and died, while the remnants of soldiers including Hoochie's father have been taken prisoner by Amurtaht, who demands a ransom of an enormous amount for their release. Hoochie, Karl and Sanson set out on a journey to the capital Bysus Impel, to report the news of battle to the king and to attain aids for the ransom.

The trio attack a group of orc bandits that has killed a traveler, and the orcs begin chasing the trio for revenge. But Hoochie defeats them powered by his OPG. Repeated battles with the orcs bring Hoochie together with Iruril Serenial, a beautiful elf woman, and Axelhand Eindelf, an old magnanimous dwarf, both of whom become his friends. Hoochie and his party visits Lenus City and solves affairs with the city's arena, and at the next city they visit, Fief Carlyle, they face difficulties from a strange pathological phenomenon all over the city. They meet Edhelin, a troll priestess, and find out that the crisis is caused by Sacred Land, a curse that combines magical and divine powers. They find out that Djipenian agents are behind the curse, which was a military experiment for the current war between the Bysus and Djipen (pronounced: Jah-ee-pun). They take one of the agents, Unchai, as a witness in reporting the curse to the king.

As they reach the Brown Mountains just west of the capital, they meet Neria, a red-haired "nighthawk" or a thief that is a member of the thieves' guild, and Gilsian, a warrior on a bull with a chattering sword, who is revealed as Prince Gilsian Bysus, the older brother of the king and the ex-heir apparent.

The dragon Kradmesser and a missing girl 
Throwing off the orcs' pursuit, the party finally arrives at the capital. They meet the king to bring the news of Catselprime's demise, and report the Djipenian operation. The king decides to help pay the ransom and they're delighted, but only briefly, for they find that there aren't enough jewels left in the capital. In the jewel mines of the Brown Mountains signs are observed of an awakening dragon that terrorized the continent 20 years ago: Kradmesser the Blazing Spear.

The House of Halschteil, the bloodline of dragon rajas, has a lost daughter. Hoochie and others hope that she is a dragon raja, so she can make the dragon raja's covenant with the awakened Kradmesser. The only thing known about her is her age and the red color of her hair.

While the party prepares for the trip to find the girl, a young nobleman Nexon Huritchell captures Neria and forces the party to steal a book with state secrets from the Halschteil mansion. The party works together to rescue both Neria and the book of secrets from Nexon's hands. Condemned of treason, Nexon attacks the party along with the vampire sorceress Shione. But Iruril returns in time to save the party from the vampire's threat.

Iruril has information about a girl in the Duchy of Ilse who may be the lost daughter of the Halschteils. They head to Ilse, along with Unchai to tell Djipen's plots to the Grand Duke of Ilse and gain Ilse's cooperation in the war. Karl and Unchai heads to the Duchy's capital, while Hoochie, Sanson, Neria and Iruril head to a temple of Teperi of Haflings and Crossroads, to hire Jereint Chimber, a young priest empowered to have the answer to any polar question. They head to the Port Del Hapa where they find Rennie who indeed turns out to be the dragon raja they were searching.

The next day, Port Del Hapa and several cities of Ilse are turned into Sacred Lands in the hands of Shione and Nexon, who, in the havoc and confusion that ensues, kidnaps Rennie.

Into the Eternal Forest 
The party chases Nexon and his underlings into the mysterious Eternal Forest, where whoever enters, on certain conditions, are divided into separate selves with identical looks but divided memories. Iruril's wisdom saves the party, but Nexon and most of his underlings fall into panic and murder each other, including three of Nexon's selves. 
Nexon takes Rennie and survived subordinates into the Great Labyrinth of the Dragon Lord. The party follows them in through dangers of every shape and meets Dragon Lord, who offers them access to his treasures, enough to pay off Amurtaht's ransom and some more. After leaving the Great Labyrinth, the party ambushes Nexon to rescue Rennie and they rush back to Bysus.

Marquess Halschteil's conspiracy 
At Red Mountains, they encounter Jigoleid, the blue dragon who fought the war for Bysus with another Halschteil raja. The raja released the dragon not only from the covenant with him but also from the battlefield with Djipan, to serious military consequences. The party stop by Kan Adium, a city in the middle of wild plain, where they face another attacks from the orcs, now a big army, and defeat them.

They arrive at the capital, and find out that Marquess Halschteil has been making plans to take hold of a raja who could make the covenant with Kradmesser, and use the legendary dragon's power to take over Bysus. The party hasten to take Rennie to the Brown Mountains where Kradmesser's lair is. In the mountains, they pass the Lake Levnane where lives the Fairyqueen Darenian who was Handrake the archmage's lover 300 years ago.

Kradmesser awakes 
Kradmesser is awakened at last. Haschteil, Nexon and Hoochie's party race and fight against each other to meet the dragon first. Kradmesser however, reveals that he intends neither to destroy Bysus and the continent, nor to accept another covenant with a dragon raja. Nexon, who has succeeded the gift from his father, the previous raja to Kradmesser, convinces the dragon forcibly to make the dragon raja's covenant with him. When their covenant is complete, Shione the vampire reveals her true intention.

Main characters

People from Heltant

Hutch Nedval 
Hutch Nedval (pronounced 'Hoo-chie Nedval')is the main protagonist and narrator of Dragon Raja. The book covers three months of the 17-year-old's magical autumn; the one autumn in a lifetime when amazing things can be done by those who realize it, from the time the leaves cover the earth to the time the first snowflake falls.

Hutch's father joins the expedition to defeat Amurtaht, to see the fall of the dragon that caused his wife's death. Thus, when the army loses and gets taken prisoner by Amurtaht, Hutch agrees to join Karl and Sanson on their trip to attain enough funds for the ransom to rescue the soldiers and his father. His lack of formal training in sword fight is compensated by the superhuman muscle power from the Ogre Power Gauntlets which the wizard Tyburn has presented him, and Hutch  turns one of the most acrobatic fighters in the story.

Concept and creation 
Lee is quoted to say that Hutch's name came from the first and last syllables of Huanmu-chi (Korean: 후안무치, Hanja: 厚顔無恥) which literally means "thick-skinned face no shame," or "acts brazen and feels no shame."

Characterisation 
Hardened by the precarious life in Fief Heltant, Hutch has a strong stomach for bloodshed and a fearless sense of humor. His quick wit and clever tongue solve many problems and his narration alternates constantly between philosophical lines of thought and moments of comic relief.
Although not formally schooled, Hutch has been taken into a sort of tutelage under Karl, and is one of the most eloquent speakers in the story. He also enjoys singing greatly, and sings several ballads and sagas during the journey.

Family 
Hutch is the only child of Fief Heltant's candlemaker, and is a future candlemaker candidate himself. Hutch's father brought up Hutch alone, after Hutch's mother was killed in a monsters' attack to the town. For most of the monsters that loom around the town are affected by Amurtaht, both Hutch and his father, like most of the townsfolk, see Amurtaht as the mortal enemy.

Karl Heltant 
Karl Heltant is one of the main protagonists, along with Hoochie and Sanson. Karl is the Viscount of Heltant's younger half-brother, and when the Viscount and his army are taken prisoner by Amurtaht, Karl takes up the responsibility to report the news to the king and to find aids to release the prisoners.
One of the most intelligent people in the novel, Karl often leads the party and his wisdom and decision is trusted by all.

Concept and creation 
Lee is quoted to say that Karl was named as his mind and tongue are both sharp as knife, or kal (Korean: 칼). Many of those who seek power such as King Nilsian and Nexon, attempt to persuade Karl to their side, so they can wield his mighty mind as their swords.

Characterisation 
Karl is described as an ordinary looking man in his middle-age, with ordinary brown hair. He lives a quiet life alone at the edge of the Fief Heltant, in the forest of the Viscount. Karl has extensive knowledge in history, medicine, law, economy, politics, geology, ecology, psychology, linguistics, philosophy, character acting and horseback longbow archery. He is also hobby cidermaker and bibliographer. He also has taken the role of Hoochie's tutor, and the result of this tutelage can be seen in Hoochie's skills in narrating the story.
Karl always acts kind and polite, taken to call people by their surname when possible. When he is angered however, as his name suggests, he becomes extremely sharp-tongued.

Family 
Born between the previous Viscount and a maidservant of his castle, Karl is the younger half-brother of the current Viscount of Heltant. He left Heltant as a boy and roamed in many places, then came back as a grown man. He declined his half-brother's offer to take him into the castle as a family, and has lived alone in the woods since.
It is suggested that during his years outside Heltant, Karl has educated himself and tried his hand at a political track, but was disillusioned by the unstable structure of the kingdom, and headed back to his hometown in resignation.

Sanson Percival 
Sanson Percival is one of the protagonists, along with Hoochie and Karl in Dragon Raja. Sanson is the captain of guards of the Fief Heltant. One of the survivors who made it back to the town, Sanson is assigned as Karl's personal guard outside Heltant.
Sanson is a heavily built warrior, whose physics draw comments from passersby, and earned him the nickname "ogre" by Hoochie. He is also the best of best soldiers, born through "about thirty five, or six" deadly battles against Heltant's monsters.

Concept and creation 
Lee is quoted to say that Sanson was named as his hands are strong, or ssen son (Korean: 쎈 손), at battles. The last name Percival has originated from the Knights of the Round Table.

Characterisation 
Sanson is 27 years old, and is good friends with Hoochie, despite the 10-year difference between them. He is frankly spoken and simple-minded, even dull-headed at times. However, his honesty and good nature, on top of his swordsmanship, earns him others' respect.

The Maid of the Mill 
Sanson is secretly seeing a maid from the castle, who has promised to marry him on his return from the capital. Her identity has been narrowed down by Hoochie to the following three: Margret from the Kitchen, the blonde Anne in the laundry and Gladys in the storehouse. Hoochie has made a song of the maiden to taunt Sanson, and the last line of the song is supposed to reveal the secret name.

Family 
Sanson is a son of the castle's blacksmith, Joyce Percival, and has come to know Hoochie whose father presents candles to the castle.

Companions of Hutch's journey (In order of appearance)

Iruril Sereniel 

Iruril Sereniel is an ethereal elf who initially appears when Hutch, Karl and Sanson are 
fighting off orcs. After conversing with them about being friends or foes, she feels an intellectual 
interest in the three humans and decides to accompany them on their way toward the capital. As their 
journey goes on, she grows more emotionally open and builds close friendship with Hoochie and the 
rest of the party.

Concept and creation 
Lee is quoted as saying, that the common image of elves in Korean culture is that of Tolkien 
or Japanese anime such as the Loddoss War, where an elf would "fight like a ninja, and smile 
like a geisha." He wanted to explore a mind that is fundamentally 
different from that of humans, and created his definition of elf as a race of perfect harmony, 
represented solely by Iruril in the story.
The name Iruril is similar to the Korean expression iruri (Korean: 이루리), 
which means "shall accomplish."

Characterisation 
A beautiful elf woman with long black hair and black eyes, Iruril is always dressed in a pair of leather pants, a leather jacket and a white blouse. She is an excellent fighter who can skin her enemy with her estoc and main-gauche without a bat of an eye, and also a powerful sorceress who has learned most of the spells known to people and has the racial affinity with elementals and spirits.
She is a rational creature and has only theoretical knowledge of human psychology and customs, and often makes naive remarks with hilarious, if not embarrassing innuendos.

Iruril's duty for elves 
Iruril is on a journey to find the answer to the future of elves. Uphinel's little children, elves have found contradiction in their being as the race of a complete harmony. They decide one solution to the problem is to leave this world and dimension altogether, to where they can exist without contradiction. Iruril's mission is to find a spell to achieve such world, or to find the only wizard that is known to have created such spell: Handrake the Archmage.

Axelhand Eindelf 
Axelhand Eindelf is the dwarves' Knocker, the highest rank of honor given to the dwarves' political leader. A hearty, free-going and straightforward character, he adventures out to inform about the terrible danger that threatens both Human and Dwarven society.

Characterisation 
Axelhand is a stout male with his race's symbolic beard, black eyes and dark complexion. He wields a huge battle axe. He insists on traveling on foot, typical of his race, but accompanying Hoochies, he grows more comfortable on traveling on wheels, and even on horseback.

Duties as Dwarves' Knocker 
Axelhand is the political leader and representative of all dwarves, whose main city is located in the middle of the Brown Mountains. Miners in the mountains have reported sounds of a dragon's awakening, and Axelhand has traveled to Bysus Impel, the largest city of humans, to look at human records to research the dragon.

Aphnaidel 
Aphnaidel is a young human wizard. He initially appears as Baron Silikian's hired wizard, calling himself an "Archmage." When Hoochies confront the Baron, Aphnaidel attempts to subdue them with his rudimentary magic, but is quickly subdued by Iruril. Upon Iruril's confrontation afterwards, he reforms himself and leaves Baron's service.
On his own journey he meets Axelhand, and later joins the party as a changed man.

Concept and creation 
Aphnaidel's name came from a joke; read backward it spells Ledianhpa, or 레디안봐, which could be "will not see Ledi" or "Ledi will not see." Ledi, or Ledios, was a Korean fantasy writer who promised Lee a review for Dragon Raja if it was serialized longer than 20 postings. But the speed and quality of the 20 postings made Ledios regret his decision and he never wrote the review. Aphnaidel was Lee's answer to the writer's fraud.

Characterization 
A young man with much self-doubt, Aphnaidel is never truly confident in his skills as a wizard. But his pride and passion for his art, and an intelligent mind leads others to trust and recognize him, especially Axelhand and Hoochie, latter giving him the name Topmage.

Aphnaidel's past 
In the story Aphnaidel has taken his name from his master, Jonathan Aphnaidel, Bysus's Royal Wizard. As a young apprentice, he was frustrated the seemingly slow progress and had abandoned his tutorship. The student's true name hasn't been revealed.

Unchai 
Unchai is a spy from Djipen, the enemy state of Bysus. He is captured by Hoochies while on his mission to experiment the use of Sacred Land, the land where only one god's rule dominate, as a biological weapon.
On his way to the capital to be tried, Unchai is influenced by Hoochie, Gilsian and others to change sides and expose Djipen's experiments to the world.

Characterization 
Unchai is a strong fighter with Djipenian fast swordsmanship, which also trains the use of killing aura. With the aura and his sharp, slanted eyes Unchai causes great fear in his opponents, and earns the name "Monster Eyeball."
Djipenian custom forbids men from interacting with women other than their relatives. When women in the party, mostly Neria, talks to him, Unchai tells Hoochie to answer for him. Through this 3-way interaction, he grows romantically involved with Neria.

Unchai's Past 
Not many things are known about Unchai, other than that he loves his mother nation and its customs. More of his past and family background is revealed in Future Walker.

Neria 
Neria "the Trident" is a thief but prefers to be called a "nighthawk." She first appears when she tries to rob Hoochie's party at the crossing to the Iramus Bridge. When Sanson unarms her easily, she tricks him into giving him a ride, robbing him clean on the way.
Karl and the party tricks her back and capture her, but find out that she has already used up her money to pay her dues at the town's thieves' guild. The party lets her go, and in turn, Neria goes out of her way to gather and return the money. This exchange of goodwill leads her to join the party.

Characterization 
A red-haired young woman, Neria is an agile fighter. In the party she is the most street-wise, sentimental, and tolerant to alcohol. Hot-tempered and a romantic at heart, she constantly argues with Unchai, via Hoochie, and grows in love with him.

Neria's Past 
As an orphan, she doesn't know her exact age. She grew up as a street urchin then joined the thieves guild, where "the Trident" is a known name, especially for killing a guy called Moondancer.
She is traumatized by being alone in the dark and thunderstorm, latter of which sparks the first physical contact and romance with Unchai.

Gilsian Bysus 
Gilsian Bysus is a charismatic prince of Bysus. He was the heir apparent, but dethroned by the House of Lords when he left the palace to roam freely around the world, and his younger brother Nilsian ascended the throne. Hoochie sees Gilsian as his 'King' who shows innate greatness, reminiscent of his royal ancestor and the first king, Luterino the Great. Gilsian's treasured possessions include the royal family's treasure, Prim Blade, an enchanted sword with a mind of its own, and Thunder Rider, a white-maned black stallion which has been turned into a bull by a dark mage's curse.

Jereint Chimber 
Jereint Chimber is a priest of Teperi, jokingly called "Teperi's misfortune" by his colleagues. His devotion to Teperi gives him powers to make the right choice for a yes or no question. He is easy-going and high-spirited, and has little respect for the binding rules that applies to a priest.

Antagonists

Nexon Heuritchel 
Nexon Heuritchel- Son of a Raja and presumed a Raja himself. He is a noble-born with great ambitions. He secretly plans to overthrow the King Nilsyon and override the Kingdom of Bysus.

Other notable characters

Tyburn Highseeker 
Tyburn Highseeker is a mysterious blind mage who stumbles into Heltant during the battle between Catselprime and Amurtaht. He rewards Hoochie with a pair of Ogre Power Gauntlets for saving him form the edge of death.
At the end of the novel, he is revealed as the Handrake the Archmage, the heroic wizard who helped build the kingdom of Bysus 300 years ago. Turned into a vampire by Shione at his deathbed, he has survived to this day under the name Tyburn.

Dragon Raja universe

Races 
In Dragon Raja there are eight sentient races present, eight type of beings who can talk, think and worship.

Humans - The only ones favored by both Uphinel and Helkanes (See Dragon Raja#Deities and Religions), they may worship all gods, while other races follow the deity of their race.
Elves - Uphinel's little children. They are defined by being in complete harmony with others and among themselves. Elves' primal religion is Gran Elver.
Dwarves - Known for their gift and affinity with metals and gems, dwarves' eyes see through all illusions and deceptions. A proud race who count honor above all else, dwarves' primal religion is Kariss Numen.
Halflings - A race with light furry feet and height half that of humans, they're a dexterous race. Halflings' primal religion is Teperi.
Orcs - A race of fierce fighters, orcs have short, stocky bodies compared to humans and boar-like heads. Survival of the fittest is their social norm, and battles, especially battles in vengeance is the most important activity for orcs. Orcs are nocturnal creatures, and only males go out of their caves, while females bring up the youth in the deepest part of the cave. Orcs' primal religion is Farencha.
Fairies - A race of little bodies with wings, fairies live above the boundary of dimensions, even that of gods. In the place of a deity, the Fairyqueen rules and represents the fairies.
Dragon - A race of strength that far surpasses the other races, dragons answer to none, no gods, but themselves. Dragons are said to be the owners of magic, and the first ones to teach magic to other races.
The Eighth, Unknown Race - Nothing is known about the eighth race, not even whether they exist or not.

Deities and Religions

Uphinel and Helkanes 
The universe of Dragon Raja is ruled by two principles: harmony (Uphinel) and chaos (Helkanes). The two principles are interdependent and to coexist the two created time. With time everything in the world started the cycle of birth, death and rebirth.
Uphinel is often referred to as a balance and Helkanes as the mass. But although they are named, Uphinel and Helkanes are more of universal principles than deities. All religions acknowledge the two but worship their lower deities instead.
The eight races with stars follow either of the two, except humans and dragons; both Uphinel and Helcaness concern with humans and intervene endlessly; neither Uphinel or Helcaness intervenes with dragons, who rely on no god but themselves.

The lower deities

Deities under Upinel 
 Ashas of Eagle and Glory  - The state religion of Bysus
 Gran Elver of Elves and Purity - Primal religion of the elves. The Protector of Chaste Maidens. Gran Elver's library is where the universe's history and knowledge is stored.
 Isa of Oblivion and Aurora - Isa's maidens ask Isa for all the lights from the sky except the sun,
 Kolie of Cats and Dreams - An ancient religion that was annihilated by the Bysus army
 Nileem of Chains and Freedom - The state religion of Djipen
 Orem of Roses and Justice - The state religion of the Principality of Ilse
 Simunian of Earth and Recollection - Primal religion of Humans as a race, the Great Mother Earth. Her larder is said to be boundless. The wife of Grim Ocenia, the tears she sheds for his loss for eternity salts the seawater.
 Ylseine of Mountains and Concealment - The last goddess to leave the earth.

Deities under Helkanes 

 Edhelbroy of Cosmos and Storms
 Farencha of Orcs and Vengeance - The Primal religion of the orcs
 Gheden of Crows and Disease - The Biggest Crow, the First Cause of Disease, the Gravedigger That Digs Out.
Gheden's symbol is a two-headed crow, for disease comes day and night.

 Grim Ocenia of Seagull and Aspiration - Primal religion of Humans as a race, the Great Father Ocean. The First Fisherman, the First to Be Lost at Sea, his great body lies somewhere in the bottom of the ocean.
 Karis Numen of Dwarves and Fire - The primal religion of the dwarves
 Leti of Swords and Destruction - His clerics pray through sharpening their swordsmanship, and discard names
and do not own names which identity.

 Teperi of Haflings and Crossroads - Primal religion of the Halflings. His clerics are given the power of crossroads; when faced with two choices, they're able to choose the right one (right, fundamentally, for Teperi).

Themes 

The main theme of Dragon Raja is human relationship, characteristics that makes humans humans, the theme that is repeatedly explored in different ways throughout the book.

Human Harmony

One of the recurring aspects of human relationship is the human trait that allows them to harmony with these that are different from them. During tha story it is quoted- To create a wall hay, dirt, clay, and water all need to be mixed together. They are different substances but end up creating harmony. it shows that people need to be different, unique, with individuality to make harmony. Elves call themselves a failure of Juphinel because they are all the same and hence it is impossible for them to be harmonious in the true context of the concept of "harmony." Harmony is only possible when individuals with visible differences are mixed perfectly without conflict; since no elf in the world of D\R carries any distinguishable differences from another, the elves are incapable of creating harmony among themselves.

Human Individuality

Another aspect of human relationship that is seen in the book is the fact that humans have individuality or ego, that they keep dearer then their own lives, and because of this reason they cannot accept those that are identical to them. Because of individuality, something that humans possess while all other races do not, humans are able to make harmony with those that are different from them but it also makes humans cling to their individual self, unable to accept these that are identical to them.

Multiple Identity

Another trait of humans that is explored in Dragon Raja is the humankind's ability to embrace his or her different identities. The famous line of the novel, I am not one is repeatedly spoken by many characters throughout the novel. This illustrates the human ability to possess many different identities and embrace all of them at the same time, even though they may all conflict. Karl, a character in the novel, explains this quote to the Dragon Lord by saying he is Karl the Hoochie's old friend, Karl the half-brother of Lord of Heltant, Karl the Sanson's friend and Karl the leader of the group. He has so many identities yet is able to embrace and seek harmony among all of them, which is an ability that none of other races, not even the dragons, possess.

Human Influence

The author observed how human influence resulting from active interactions between the Human race and the factors which surround it affect the rest of the world. The quote that Karl speaks of, which goes "When an Elf walks in the forest, she becomes a tree; when a Man walks in the forest, he creates a trail. When an Elf looks up at the sky, she becomes a star; when a Man looks up at the sky, he creates constellations...," sums up the vast difference in the ways humans and elves affect the surroundings with their respective interactions. It is an important characteristic that the Humans in the world of D\R naturally possess: the will to change those that are around them. This distinguishes the race of Humans from the rest of the creatures as no other race causes such radical changes in their surroundings as humans do. However, while humans have succeeded in even altering the ego of a dragon through the help of a raja, the only exception comes in the town of Heltant where Amurtaat, the dragon without a raja, reversibly changes the humans into accepting her presence among them. This gives Hooch, the main protagonist, hope, in a way that when Humans in the future generation go out of control with the other races diminishing from the world gradually from their lack of individuality and will to impose on others, Amurtaat, and the End which she signifies, can either stop the Human race from speeding towards their own downfall, or teach them a lesson.

Development, publication and reception

Development 
In the summer of 1997, Lee was reading and began daydreaming, "in this world wouldn't there be beings other than humanity? What is the humanity's identity?" Lee began thinking of a world where humans and those who are not humans lead intertwined lives. On 3 October, Lee posted the first chapter of Dragon Raja to a forum where he logged in frequently to read others' works.
Lee's story soon attracted thousands of readers, who waited every day for Lee's new chapter. Lee posted usually well after midnight, partly because he had to avoid the unstableness of high traffic, to upload his daily quota, which was 25+ pages on average. The queuing fans called themselves zombies, and Lee their Necromancer, waking them from their sleep every night to check if Lee has posted yet.

Publication 
Lee's speed of writing attracted publishers as well. A month into serializing Dragon Raja several publishers had contacted Lee, and four months after the first chapter, Lee went to Seoul for the first time for his first publishing deal with Golden Bough.

Reception 
Currently Lee Yeongdo is making a deal to get his works published in the United States. Currently they are talking about 3 Dragon Raja books, while the rest are unsure. The US company says that they want direct translation from Korean to English. Many Korean fans are excited about this news. They are waiting for the turn out of the latest meeting.

Dragon Raja has been published in China, Taiwan, and Japan with highly successful results.
The Japanese version of Dragon Raja was recently concluded with all 12 volumes published.

Adaptations

Dragon Raja Online 
The world of Dragon Raja and some of the main characters have been used as a basis for a MMORPG, Dragon Raja Online, or DRO. The game began development in 1998 with the investment by Samsung Electronics, and was released in 2000 in South Korea, and later in 10 countries including Taiwan and China as 龍族.
where the novel was published in the same title and marketed along with the game.
After a series of M&A of its developing company over the years, DRO's Korean service was closed in 2011. The English version of the game however, can be accessed at here and the global service has remained live.

Dragon Raja Mobile 
In 2004 a mobile RPG Dragon Raja Mobile, or DRM, was released through KTF's mobile game services. The game's storyline of 15-hours playtime on average, was based on the beginning chapters of the novel.

Illustrated novels
The Japanese edition of Dragon Raja and Future Walker are illustrated by Eiji Kaneda who is known for his works for the anime series Genesis of Aquarion.

Comic books
Dragon Raja was an inspiration for a series of comic books by Son Bong-gyu of the same title.

Radio
Dragon Raja was adopted as a part of KBS Radio 2's Fantasy Express program, and the total of 83 episodes ran in 2001.

References

External links

 Lee Yeongdo's official publishing community (Korean)
 Dragon Raja Worldwide MMORPG server

South Korean fantasy novels
1998 fantasy novels
Novels first published online
Novels first published in serial form
Novels about dragons]